Mersin Province, formerly İçel Province, is a province in southern Turkey, on the Mediterranean coast between Antalya and Adana. The provincial capital and the biggest city in the province is Mersin, which is composed of four municipalities and district governorates: Akdeniz, Mezitli, Toroslar and Yenişehir. Next largest is Tarsus, the birthplace of Paul the Apostle. The province is considered to be a part of the geographical, economical and cultural region of Çukurova, which covers the provinces of Mersin, Adana, Osmaniye and Hatay.

The capital of the province is the city of Mersin.

Etymology 
The province is named after its biggest city Mersin. Mersin was named after the aromatic plant genus Myrsine in the family Primulaceae, a myrtle that grows in abundance in the area. The 17th-century Ottoman traveler Evliya Çelebi has recorded in his Seyahatnâme that there was also a clan named Mersinoğulları in the area.

Geography

Ninth biggest province of Turkey by land area, Mersin consists %2,02 of Turkey. 87% of the land area is mountain, leading up to the rocky heights of the central Taurus Mountains, the highest peak is Medetsiz (3,584 m) in the Bolkar range, and there are a number of important passes over to central Anatolia. There are many high meadows and small plains between 700 and 1500m.

The coastal strip has many large areas of flatland, formed from soil brought down by rivers and streams running off the mountains. This is fertile land, the largest area being the plain of Tarsus. The largest rivers are the Göksu and the Berdan (Göksu Calycadnus and  Berdan Cydnus of antiquity), but there are many small streams running into lakes, reservoirs or the Mediterranean sea. Mersin has 321 km of coastline, much of it sandy beach. The climate is typical of the Mediterranean; very hot and very humid in summer, warm and wet in winter; the winter rains can be very heavy and flooding is a problem in many areas, but it never snows on the coast, although there is snow in the mountainous areas.

History

In antiquity, this coast was part of Cilicia, named for a Phoenician or Assyrian prince that had settled here. Trade from Syria and Mesopotamia over the mountains to central Anatolia passed through here, through the Cilician Gates. The geographer Strabo, described the region as being divided into "Rugged Cilicia" (Cilicia Trachea, Κιλικία Τραχεία in Greek) and "Flat Cilicia" (Cilicia Pedias, Κιλικία Πεδιάς). The capital of both sections of Cilicia was Tarsus and Mersin was its seaport. The Seljuks later captured it from the Byzantines and it then came under the Crusaders then the Seljuks again and finally the Ottomans captured it and it remained part of the Ottoman Empire until 1922.

Administration 
The province of Mersin between 1923 and 1933 didn't include the western territories of the modern province, which then constituted the province of İçel with Silifke as its administrative center. In 1933, the provinces of Mersin and İçel were merged. The new province was named "İçel" and the city of Mersin was made its capital. The province was renamed to "Mersin" in 28 June 2002.

Districts 

Mersin province is divided into thirteen districts four of which are actually included within the municipality of Mersin city (shown in boldface letters).

Akdeniz
Anamur
Aydıncık
Bozyazı
Çamlıyayla
Erdemli
Gülnar
Mezitli
Mut
Silifke
Tarsus
Toroslar
Yenişehir

Demographics 

About 50% of the population of the province is younger than 24 years of age. 68% were born in Mersin. The literacy rate is 89%. About 43% of the male population and about 27% of the female population graduated from middle school. Infant mortality is 0.48%. Urban population growth rate is 2.42%. Population density is 117 as of November 2020.(In the table below, the four second-level municipalities are merged within Mersin proper.)

Economy 
The city of Mersin is one of busiest cities in Turkey. Due to the economic activity in this part of Turkey generated by the GAP Project Mersin is Turkey's biggest Mediterranean port, and also hosts an oil refinery and a free trade zone; there are a number of factories along the road between Mersin and Adana, manufacturing glass, detergents, fertilizers and many more. With all this activity a modern city has grown with a university and other major amenities.

Tourism
Mersin does not have the huge volume of tourists enjoyed by neighbouring Antalya or the Aegean coast, but Turkish people do come to this coast, especially now that the hotels have air-conditioning, and perhaps more to the mountain country behind where there are healing mineral water springs. In summer the hills are a popular retreat from the high humidity and extreme heat on the coast. West of Mersin includes bays, and little islands. Yacht touring is a tourism income in these areas.

Places of interest
 The city of Tarsus, birthplace of St Paul, whose house and well are sites of Christian pilgrimage.
 Alahan Monastery
 Silifke - ancient Seleucia in Isauria, buildings include the church of Aya Tekla, the first female saint.
The ancient Roman town of Soloi-Pompeiopolis, now within the city. About Mersin
The ancient Roman town of Anemurium, adjacent to the modern town of Anamur.
Another ancient city of Elaiussa Sebaste, 55 km from the city of Mersin.
 Castles including Mamure, Kızkalesi and Namrun.
 Yerköprü Waterfall

Towns and other geographic features

Towns

Arslanköy
Ayvagediği
Büyükeceli
Çarıklar
Çeşmeli
Göksu
Gözne
Gülek
Fındıkpınarı
Kargıpınarı
Kızkalesi
Kocahasanlı
Köseçobanlı
Kuskan
Limonlu
Narlıkuyu
Ören
Sebil
Taşucu
Tekeli
Tekmen
Uzuncaburç
Yenice
Yeşilovacık
Yeşiltepe
Zeyne

Archaeological and historical

Adamkayalar
Alahan Monastery
Altından geçme
Akhayat sinkhole
Aya Tekla Church
Baç Bridge
Bilal Habeşi Masjid
Canbazlı ruins
Caracalla's inscription
Cennet and Cehennem
Cleopatra's gate
Corycus
Çanakçı rock tombs
Dörtayak
Gözlükule
Kanlıdivane
Karakabaklı
Kırkkaşık Bedesten
Laal Pasha Mosque
Lamas Aqueduct
Mancınık Castle
Mamure Castle
Meydancık Castle
Mezgitkale
Mut Castle
Olba (ancient city)
Öküzlü ruins
Paşa Türbesi
Roman road in Cilicia
Saint Paul's Church, Tarsus
Silifke Castle
Sinekkale
Soli, Cilicia
Tapureli ruins
Tarsus Grand Mosque
Taşgeçit Bridge
Tekir ambarı
Üçayaklı ruins
Veyselli rock reliefs
Yanıkhan
Yumuktepe

Museums

Anamur Museum
Mersin Museum
Mersin Atatürk Museum
Mersin Naval Museum
Mersin Urban History Museum
Mersin Water Museum
Narlıkuyu Museum
Silifke Museum
Silifke Atatürk Museum
Tarsus Museum

Other

2013 Mediterranean Games
Berdan River
Cyprus Memorial Cemetery in Silifke
Çukurova
Dana Adası
Gulf of Mersin
Karabucak Forest
Karakız Lake
List of municipalities in Mersin Province
List of populated places in Mersin Province
Mersin Congress and Exhibition Center
Mersin Grand Mosque
Mersin Harbor
Mezitli River
Muğdat Mosque
Müftü River
Tourism centers of Mersin Province
Transport in Mersin Province
Yenice Conference (Yenice Görüşmesi )

Gallery

See also
List of populated places in Mersin Province

Notes

External links

 University of Mersin
 Real Estate Agency Mersin Turkey
 Mersin Technoscope
 Mersin Chamber of Commerce and Industry (in English)
 Mersin Chamber of Shipping (in English)
 Mersin Photographic society (in English)
 Mersin Free Zone